The Portuguese Roller Hockey First Division ( or simply 1ª Divisão; literally: Roller Hockey First Division National Championship) is the premier roller hockey league in Portugal. It was established in 1939 and Sporting CP were crowned as the first champions. Porto are the record winners with 24 titles. The league is contested by 14 teams, with the top four teams qualifying for the following season's Rink Hockey Euroleague and the fifth to eighth placed teams qualifying for the World Skate Europe Cup. The bottom three teams are relegated to the second-tier Portuguese Roller Hockey Second Division.

Champions
Below are listed the champions, runners-up and third-placed teams per season. The cumulative number of titles is shown between brackets.

Performance by club

Notes and references

Roller hockey competitions in Portugal
Roller hockey in Portugal
Portugal
Sports leagues established in 1939
1939 establishments in Portugal
Professional sports leagues in Portugal